These are community currencies (also known as "local currencies") in Canada.

 Billet Local d'Échange (BLÉ; 2018—present; Québec City)
 Bow Chinook Hour (1996—2002; replaced by CalgaryDollars.ca - present)
 Brampton dollars (1973)
 Calgary Dollars (1996, 2002—present)
 Chemainus Dollars (2010-2021)
 Chouenne (2021—present; Charlevoix, Québec)
 Cochrane Dollar
 Community Way Dollar (2009—present)
 Demi (2015—present; Gaspésie, Québec)
 Dollar solidaire (2020—present; Québec City)
 Dollar johannois (2004—present; Saint-Jean-de-Dieu, Québec)
 Holey dollar (19th century; Prince Edward Island)
 Kawartha Loon (2012–present)
 LETS - Local Exchange Trading Systems
 OUR Community Dollar (c.2004—2013.. Relaunched: 2022-present)
 Paco Dollar (2004—2017; Saint-Pacôme, Québec)
 Pioneer Petroleum "Bonus Bucks"
 Prosperity certificate (1936; Alberta)
 Salt Spring dollar (2001—present)
 Saskbucks (19??, Saskatchewan)
 Tamworth Hours
 Toronto dollar (1998—2013)
 Unity dollar (2006–present)

 L'Îlot on Montreal's island

See also
 List of community currencies in the United States
 List of community currencies in the United Kingdom

References

External links
 
 

Canadian community currencies, List of